Alexandra Aleksandrovna "Sasha" Vafina (also romanized Aleksandra Aleksandrovna Vafina; born 28 July 1990) is a Russian ice hockey forward and member of the Russian national ice hockey team, currently playing in the Zhenskaya Hockey League (ZhHL) with Dinamo-Neva Saint Petersburg.

International career
Vafina was selected for the Russia national women's ice hockey team in the 2010 Winter Olympics. She played in all five games, scoring one goal and two points.

Vafina has also represented Russia at ten IIHF Women's World Championships. Her first appearance came in 2008. She was a member of the team that won a bronze medal at the 2013 IIHF Women's World Championship.

At the 2015 Winter Universiade in Granada, Spain, Vafina was part of Russia's gold medal winning team, handing Canada its first-ever loss in FISU women's ice hockey.

She also competed in one IIHF Women's U18 World Championship with the Russia women's national under-18 ice hockey team, the inaugural event in 2008.

Career statistics

International career

Awards and honors
2015-16 U Sports First Team All-Canadian

References

External links
 
 
 
 

1990 births
Living people
Sportspeople from Almaty
Russian women's ice hockey forwards
Olympic ice hockey players of Russia
Ice hockey players at the 2010 Winter Olympics
Ice hockey players at the 2014 Winter Olympics
Ice hockey players at the 2022 Winter Olympics
Minnesota Duluth Bulldogs women's ice hockey players
Calgary Dinos ice hockey players
Russian expatriate sportspeople in Canada
Russian expatriate sportspeople in the United States
Universiade medalists in ice hockey
Universiade gold medalists for Russia
Competitors at the 2015 Winter Universiade
Competitors at the 2017 Winter Universiade